Theretra castanea is a moth of the  family Sphingidae. It is found in India.

The ground colour of both upperside and underside are very variable, the upperside sometimes more, sometimes less reddish, the underside varying from orange to pale tawny. The hindwing upperside is uniformly dark tawny-olive or blackish.

References

Theretra
Moths described in 1872